Freiesleben is a German-origin surname. Notable persons with the surname include:

 Bertrand Freiesleben (born 1967), German artist
 Johann Karl Freiesleben (1774–1846), German mineralogist

Surnames of German origin